Alberto Volpi (born 9 December 1962) is an Italian former road bicycle racer. He competed in the individual road race event at the 1984 Summer Olympics.

He formerly worked as a directeur sportif at Barloworld cycling team.

Major results

1985
1st, Gran Premio Città di Camaiore
10th, Overall, Giro d'Italia
1st, Young rider classification
1989
1st, Overall, Giro di Calabria
1st, Stage 1
1993
1st, Wincanton Classic
1997
1st, Stage 3, Volta ao Alentejo

References

External links

1962 births
Living people
Italian male cyclists
Cyclists at the 1984 Summer Olympics
Olympic cyclists of Italy
Cyclists from the Province of Varese
People from Saronno